Northern Transvaal Command was a command of the South African Army. It was active from 1959 to mid 2000 when it was disestablished. Formerly it was named Northern Command from 1946 to 1959.

History

Origins

Union Defence Force Military Districts
The command's origins may date to the formations of Military districts, No 5 and 6 in 1926, which then became Transvaal Command in 1934. Thereafter there were several quick name changes: Roberts Heights & Transvaal Command ; Voortrekkerhoogte & Transvaal Command 1939, and then Transvaal Command . Later the command became Northern Command in 1946; Northern Transvaal Command in 1959. In 1939 Roberts' Heights and Transvaal Command, with its headquarters at Roberts' Heights (now Thaba Tshwane), contained 6th Infantry Brigade, 1 Field Survey Squadron SAEC, the artillery depot, parts of the Special Service Battalion, elements of the Permanent Garrison Artillery, and the Artillery School.

Its headquarters was in Pretoria, and within its command boundaries, it contained a number of important Active Citizen Force field formations, notably 81 Armoured Brigade (part of 8th South African Armoured Division). Depending upon the command boundaries, it may also have included 72 Motorised Brigade with its headquarters at Johannesburg and 73 Motorised Brigade with its headquarters in the Johannesburg suburb of Kensington.

Under the SADF
In the early 1980s it became clear that the sheer size of Northern Transvaal Command's territory made command and control as well as logistical functions extremely difficult. These as well as other security considerations led to the decision to subdivide Northern Transvaal Command into three Commands in 1984: Northern Transvaal Command (Pretoria); Eastern Transvaal Command, probably covering what later became the Eastern Transvaal (Nelspruit); and Far North Command (Pietersburg) (commanded in succession by Charles Lloyd and, from February 1987, Georg Meiring). The two new Commands were regarded as theatres and as such also had responsibility for conventional operations (and units) within their areas. For example, Far North Command had 73 Motorised Brigade within its area.

Amalgamation with Witwatersrand Command into Gauteng Command

Groups and Commandos

Group 15 (Voortrekkerhoogte) 
 Broederstroom Commando
 Bronkhorstspruit Commando
 Hercules Commando
 Hillcrest Commando
 Irene Commando
 Moot Commando
 Munitoria Commando
 Pretoria East Commando
 Quaggapoort Commando
 Schanskop Commando
 Wonderboom Commando

Leadership

Notes

References 

Commands of the South African Army
Disbanded military units and formations in Pretoria
Military units and formations established in 1959
Military units and formations disestablished in 2000